Gilles Albert Célestin Joël Charpentier (born 1 September 1927) is a French retired politician. He served as Socialist Member of Parliament for Ardennes's 3rd constituency from 1981 to 1986.

His grandfather was Léon Charpentier, a former senator.

References 

Living people
1927 births
Deputies of the 7th National Assembly of the French Fifth Republic
20th-century French politicians
Members of Parliament for Ardennes

Socialist Party (France) politicians